Reincarnation and Biology: A Contribution to the Etiology of Birthmarks and Birth Defects is a 1997 two-part monograph  (2268 pages) written by psychiatrist Ian Stevenson and published by Praeger. Where Reincarnation and Biology Intersect is a condensation of the two books written for the general reader.

Reincarnation and Biology has been reviewed in Omega 36(3):273-274, 1997–98, and in the Journal of the American Society for Psychical Research 92:286-291, 1999. Joint reviews of Where Reincarnation and Biology Intersect and Reincarnation and Biology have also appeared in several journals.

See also
Life Before Life: A Scientific Investigation of Children's Memories of Previous Lives
Old Souls: The Scientific Evidence For Past Lives
European Cases of the Reincarnation Type

References

External links
The Division of Perceptual Studies at the University of Virginia School of Medicine.

Reincarnation research
Books about reincarnation
Parapsychology
1997 books